Sachinemuna is a city and commune of Angola, located in the province of Bié.

References 

Populated places in Bié Province
Municipalities of Angola